American National Insurance Company (ANICO) is a major American insurance corporation based in Galveston, Texas. The company and its subsidiaries operate in all 50 U.S. states and Puerto Rico.

Company description
American National was founded in 1905 by Galveston businessman William Lewis Moody Jr. Today the company offers a wide array of insurance products and services including life insurance, annuities, health insurance, property and casualty insurance, credit insurance, and pension plan services. Through its subsidiary, ANREM, the company founded and developed the large-scale housing development, South Shore Harbour, in League City, Texas.

Although a publicly traded company, the majority of the stock had been controlled by the Moody family through the Moody Foundation and Libby Shearn Moody Trust, which are administered by the trust department of the family owned Moody National Bank. In August 2021, Brookfield Asset Management announced that it had agreed to acquire ANICO for $5.1 billion. The acquisition was completed in May 2022.

Subsidiaries

 American National Life Insurance Company of Texas
 American National Life Insurance Company of New York
 American National Property And Casualty Company
 Farm Family Casualty Insurance Company
 United Farm Family Insurance Company
 Standard Life and Accident Insurance Company
 Garden State Life Insurance Company

See also 

Free State of Galveston
Galveston, Texas
Moody Foundation
Moody Gardens
Moody National Bank
National Western Life

References

External links 
 

1905 establishments in Texas
American companies established in 1905
Financial services companies established in 1905
Companies based in Galveston, Texas
Companies formerly listed on the Nasdaq
Insurance companies of the United States
Insurance companies based in Texas
2022 mergers and acquisitions
Brookfield Asset Management